Schizogregarinina  is a superfamily in the phylum Apicomplexia.

History

This superfamily was created by Léger in 1907.

Taxonomy

There are two families (Ophryocystidae and Schizocystidae) in this suborder.

General characteristics

Species in this superfamily infect the intestines of arthropods, annelids and tunicates.

The trophozoites may develop intracellularly or extracellularly. In species where the trophozoites develop extracellularly, they are attached by an epimerite. When the schizonts develop they appear like a bunch of grapes attached to the cell.

References

Conoidasida
SAR supergroup superfamilies